Eric Seymour Sibley (17 November 1915 – 1996) was a professional footballer who played as a defender for Bournemouth, Blackpool, Grimsby Town and Chester.

Playing career

Blackpool
Sibley joined Blackpool from Bournemouth during the second half of the 1937–38 season, and made his debut on 29 January in a single-goal victory at Leicester City. He went on to appear in the remaining fifteen games of the campaign.

The following season, 1938–39, Sibley started 29 of Blackpool's 42 league games, before World War II intervened. In 1945–46, Sibley made six guest appearances for Southampton.

After the conclusion of the war, in 1945–46, Sibley made six appearances for Blackpool in the Football League North.

In Sibley's final season at Bloomfield Road, 1946–47, he made 37 league appearances, as well as making his debut for the Tangerines in the FA Cup. His final game for the club occurred on 7 April, a 3–0 home defeat by Everton. He was sold to Grimsby Town.

Grimsby Town
In two years at Blundell Park, Sibley made 23 league appearances.

Chester
Sibley finished his professional career with Chester in 1950 after seven league appearances for the club. He left to become player-manager at a Lytham St Annes-based club.

References
Specific

General
Stats at Blackpool
Stats at Grimsby Town
Stats at Chester City

1915 births
1996 deaths
English footballers
Association football fullbacks
English Football League players
AFC Bournemouth players
Blackpool F.C. players
Grimsby Town F.C. players
Chester City F.C. players
Huddersfield Town A.F.C. wartime guest players
Southampton F.C. wartime guest players
People from Christchurch, Dorset
Footballers from Dorset